Martin Tietze (23 October 1908 – 13 September 1942) was a German luger who competed during the 1930s. He won seven medals at the European luge championships with five golds (Men's singles: 1934, 1935, 1937, 1938; Men's doubles: 1937) and two silvers (Men's singles: 1939, Men's doubles: 1935). Tietze's four championships in the men's singles has not been equaled .

Death 
Tietze was killed during World War II in the Soviet Union. His younger sister Friedel also competed in luge.

References

1908 births
1942 deaths
German male lugers
German military personnel killed in World War II
20th-century German people